Abu Osman Chowdhury (1 January 1936 – 5 September 2020) was a Bangladeshi war hero and freedom fighter. During the Bangladesh Liberation War, he served as the commander of Sector 8 of the Bangladesh Forces that covered the present-day Kushtia, Jashore, Khulna, Barishal, Faridpur and Patuakhali regions.

Background
Chowdhury was born on 1 January 1936, in Madnergaon village in present-day Faridganj Upazila of Chandpur District. He completed his bachelor's degree from Comilla Victoria College.

Career
Chowdhury joined the 2nd Battalion the East Bengal Regiment of the Pakistan Army in 1958. He was promoted to the Major rank in April 1968.

Role in Bangladesh liberation war
In 1971, Chowdhury was posted in Chuadanga, under Kushtia District as a major of the Pakistan army and the Commander of 4th Wing East Pakistan Rifles (EPR). He left for Kushtia with his family on 23 March 1971 to attend an official meeting. He was staying at Kushtia Circuit House on the night of 25–26 March when the news of Operation Searchlight reached him. Sensing imminent danger he left Kushtia on early morning of 26 March 1971 and headed to Chuadanga via Jhenaidah while local political workers have already revolted. Later Bengali soldiers raised the flag of Bangladesh at EPR 4th Wing Headquarters in Chuadanga. Later the 4th wing of EPR, led by Major Chowdhury and reinforced with Police and Ansar personnel and local youth, attacked 27 Baluch of Pakistan Army stationed at Kushtia and eliminated almost 2 companies.

In the first sector commander's conference in July, Chowdhury was appointed the commander of the western sector, which comprised Kushtia, Jessore, areas of Faridpur, including Doulatpur-Satkhira Road encompassed within Khulna.

It was past noon of 26 March when Chowdhury reached his Wing headquarters at Chuadanga. There, his NCOs briefed him of the overall situation including formal organisation of local resistance in the wake of the crackdown at Dhaka. In the meantime local Awami League leader Dr Ashab Ul Haq, who had earlier declared war against the occupational Pakistan armed forces the same morning at a public meeting, had contacted him over telephone and invited him to an emergency meeting with the public leaders and representatives of the local administration. At the meeting Chowdhury was asked to take charge of the armed resistance force that he accepted at once. After a long discussion the first ever war command of Bangladesh, named South Western Command, was formed on 26 March 1971 in Chuadanga. While Chowdhury was given the position of the Commander, Dr Ashab Ul Haq, MPA became the Chief Advisor and Barrister Abu Ahmed Afzalur Rashid alias Badal Rashid, MNA, and Advocate Yunus Ali, MPA, were made Deputy Chief Advisors. The whole of western region of the Padma was taken under the command comprising that of Kushtia, Faridpur, Jessore, Khulna districts. All the armed personnel from defence, EPR, Police, Ansar, Mujahid and armed student wing of the area were vested under the Command. The newly built District Council Dak Bungalow was made the Command Headquarters. The next day on 27 March at about noon the Pakistani flag, last flying one at the EPR Wing headquarters was ceremoniously lowered and the tri-colour Bangladesh flag was hoisted at the flag post by Chowdhury. Captain A R Azam Chowdhury, his deputy, was there who afterwards played valiant role under the Command. Chowdhury held the position until division of Bangladesh war commands into 11 Sectors by the Provisional Government on 11 July 1971. The South Western Command was then renamed Sector-8 with some revision of the command area and Chowdhury continued to hold the position of the Sector Commander until Major M Abul Manjur took over in September 1971.

Post war
On 7 November 1975, during the 1975 coup, Chowdhury's wife, Nazia Osman was killed in his Gulshan residence. He retired from Bangladesh Army as a lieutenant colonel in 1976. In 2014 he was awarded the Independence Day Award for his contribution to the Bangladesh Liberation war. On 5 September 2020, he died at the Combined Military Hospital in Dhaka. Though he initially tested positive for COVID-19, a subsequent test did not detect the virus. Abu Osman Chowdhury was given a state funeral and buried at Banani Army Graveyard.

References

1936 births
2020 deaths
People from Chandpur District
Comilla Victoria Government College alumni
Bangladeshi lieutenant colonels
People of the Bangladesh Liberation War
Recipients of the Independence Day Award
Burials at Banani Graveyard